Omega is a novel by Raymond Leonard published in 1986.

Plot summary
Omega is a novel in which humanity builds a super-computer called OMEGA to solve all of their problems.

Reception
Dave Langford reviewed Omega for White Dwarf #83, and stated that "It takes endless pages of dreadful portentiousness and worse dialogue to reach the timeworn punchline of Fredric Brown's one-pager, which (as every fan knows) goes 'Yes, now there is a God!'"

Reviews
Review by Keith Freeman (1987) in Vector 136

References

1986 novels